The 2011–12 Big East Conference men's basketball season was the 33rd season of competitive basketball played by the Big East Conference, since its inception in 1979, and involved its 16 full-time member schools. The season officially opened on December 27, 2011, when Notre Dame defeated Pittsburgh, 72–59, and St. John's defeated Providence, 91–67, and ended on March 3, 2012, with a 61–58 victory for Rutgers over St. John's.

Marquette captured the first of two consecutive regular season titles after Syracuse was forced to vacate 9 wins from the 2011-2012 season, and third outright, with a conference win–loss record of 17–1, which tied Connecticut in 1995–96 for most regular season conference wins in conference history. The Orange also received the no. 1 seed in the Big East tournament, and a bye into the quarterfinals, along with 2nd-seed Marquette, 3rd-seed Notre Dame, and 4th-seed Cincinnati. Georgetown, South Florida, Louisville, and West Virginia rounded out the top eight, and all received a bye into the tournament's second round. Play began at noon on Tuesday, March 6 in Madison Square Garden, when 9th-seed Connecticut defeated 16th-seed DePaul, 81–67. Play ended on Saturday, March 10, when Louisville defeated Cincinnati, 50–44, for their second Big East Championship.

The Big East led all conferences in having nine teams selected to the 2012 NCAA Men's Division I Basketball Tournament.

The 2011–12 season marked the Big East's seventh and final season as a 16-team basketball league, with the departure of West Virginia to the Big 12 Conference for the 2012–13 season.

Preseason

Coaching changes

Prior to the start of the 2011–12 season, one Big East program hired a new coach, following the dismissal or resignation of their former coach:

Providence: After three seasons, Providence fired Keno Davis on March 11, 2011, despite five years remaining on Davis' contract. After an NIT berth in 2008–09, Davis' squad finished 15th and 14th in the conference in 2009–10 and 2010–11, respectively. Davis finished with a 46–50 (.479) overall record and 18–36 (.333) conference record. He was replaced with Fairfield head coach and Providence native Ed Cooley on March 22, 2011.

Conference predictions

At Big East media day on October 19, the conference released their predictions for standings and All-Big East teams.

Predicted Big East results

Preseason All-Big East teams 

Big East Preseason Player of the Year: Ashton Gibbs, G., Pittsburgh 
Big East Preseason Rookie of the Year: Andre Drummond, C., Connecticut

Preseason national polls

Watchlists
On October 3, the Wooden Award preseason watch list included ten Big East players. The watchlist was composed of 50 players who were not transfers, freshmen or medical redshirts. On November 7, the Naismith College Player of the Year watchlist of 50 players was announced, which included nine Big East names.

Regular season

Season summary & highlights
Syracuse won the NIT Season Tip-Off, defeating Stanford in the finals, 69–63.
Marquette won the Paradise Jam Tournament, defeating Norfolk State in the finals, 59–57.
On November 11, Louisville head coach Rick Pitino recorded his 600th career win in an 83–48 victory over Tennessee–Martin. He became the 15th fastest coach to do so (38th overall).
On November 27, Syracuse fired associate head coach Bernie Fine, who had been an assistant under head coach Jim Boeheim since 1976, after Fine was alleged to have sexually abused team ball boys decades prior.
Connecticut head coach Jim Calhoun was suspended for the first three games of the Big East regular season, following NCAA sanctions in February 2011 for recruiting violations. Under associate head coach George Blaney, the Huskies went 2–1 to start their conference schedule.
On February 3, Calhoun took his second medical leave of absence in three seasons, eventually undergoing surgery on February 27 for spinal stenosis. The Huskies went 3–5 under Blaney before Calhoun returned to coach in the regular season finale.
With 30 regular season wins, Syracuse set a school record, eclipsing the mark of 28 regular season wins set in 2009–10. With a 17–1 conference record, the Orange tied the 1995–96 Connecticut squad, which also went 17–1, for conference wins. They also became the first team in Big East history with just one regular season loss overall (January 21 at Notre Dame, 67–58). Syracuse was also unbeaten at home in the Carrier Dome, for the second time in school history (2002–03).

Midseason watchlists
On January 17, the Wooden Award midseason watchlist was released, and included four Big East players. The list was composed of 25 players, reduced from the preseason list of 50. There were no newcomers to the list from the preseason. In addition, seven Big East players who were on the preseason list did not appear at midseason: Tim Abromaitis, Andre Drummond, Ashton Gibbs, Scoop Jardine, Alex Oriakhi, Peyton Siva, and Maalik Wayns. On February 29, the Naismith Top 30 was announced, and included newcomer Syracuse guard Dion Waiters. Meanwhile, Abromaitis, Drummond, Gibbs, Jeremy Lamb, Oriakhi, and Siva, who were on the preseason list, did not appear at midseason.

Composite matrix
This table summarizes the head-to-head results between teams in conference play.

Statistical leaders 

The regular season team, individual, and attendance figures include all conference and non-conference games played from November 7, 2011 through March 3, 2012.

Team

Individual

Attendance

Postseason

Big East tournament

For the fourth straight year, all 16 teams in the conference participated in the Big East tournament. Under this format, the teams finishing 9 through 16 in the regular season standings played first-round games, while teams 5 through 8 received a bye to the second round. The top 4 teams during the regular season received a bye to the quarterfinals. The five-round tournament spanned five consecutive days, from Tuesday, March 6, through Saturday, March 10, at Madison Square Garden in New York City.

Highlights
 The Championship match-up between Louisville and Cincinnati was the first time in the 34-year history of the tournament that at least one of the original seven members of the conference wasn't involved in the title game.

NCAA tournament 

The official tournament selection process took place on Sunday, March 11, and the following nine Big East teams received bids into the tournament:

After winning the 2012 Big East men's basketball tournament, Louisville continued its winning streak all the way to the Final Four in New Orleans, Louisiana, but was defeated by Kentucky, who then defeated Kansas for the national championship. Louisville guard Peyton Siva, forward Chane Behanan, and center Gorgui Dieng were named to the West All-Regional team, with Siva tapped as the Most Outstanding Player of the region. Syracuse guard Scoop Jardine was named to the East All-Regional team.

National Invitation tournament 

After not receiving a bid to the 2012 NCAA Men's Division I Basketball Tournament, Seton Hall was selected as a top seed to the 2012 National Invitation Tournament. They defeated Stony Brook in the first round before losing to Massachusetts in the second round.

Rankings

Awards and honors

Conference awards and teams 

The following individuals received postseason honors after having been chosen by the Big East Conference coaches.

The Player of the Year, Coach of the Year, Rookie of the Year, and Scholar Athlete of the Year awards were announced on Tuesday, March 6, after the post-game interviews of the first session of the first round of the Big East tournament. The remainder of the individual awards were announced on Monday, March 5, while the All-Big East Men's Basketball Teams were announced on Sunday, March 4. Awardees are chosen by a simple ballot, in which coaches are not allowed to vote for their players or themselves (in the case of the Big East Coach of the Year). Coaches voted for Big East Player of the Year and Rookie of the Year from the first team and all-rookie lists, respectively.

Marquette senior forward Jae Crowder was named Player of the Year. Crowder finished the regular season averaging 17.6 points per game, third in the conference, while ranking ninth in the conference in rebounds (7.9 per game). He also ranked second in the Big East in steals (2.4 per game) and recorded seven double-doubles for a Marquette squad that finished second in the conference. South Florida head coach Stan Heath was named Coach of the Year, after leading the Bulls to their first winning conference record (12–6) in the school's seven seasons in the league. Notre Dame's Tim Abromaitis, a graduate forward, became the first player to receive the Scholar Athlete of the Year award for the third year in a row. He was limited to two games in 2011–12 due to injury.

Defensive Player of the Year Feb Melo, a sophomore center from Syracuse, led the conference in blocks, averaging 3.7 blocks per game during the conference season.

St. John's freshman forward Moe Harkless was named Rookie of the Year, after averaging 15.5 points per game, second highest among conference freshmen and sixth among freshmen nationally, and 8.5 rebounds per game, also second among Big East freshmen.

Other awardees included most improved player Jack Cooley, a junior forward from Notre Dame, who went from playing 10.3 minutes per game in 2010–11 to leading the conference in field goal percentage (.621) and finishing fourth in rebounds per game (9.2) in both conference and non-conference play in 2011–12. Syracuse sophomore guard Dion Waiters was honored with the Sixth Man Award, coming off the bench but serving as the Orange's second-leading scorer (11.9 points per game) and team leader in steals (1.9 per game). Finally, Georgetown senior guard Jason Clark received the Sportsmanship Award.

On the All-Big East Men's Basketball Teams, notable members of the first team included Clark, who was given no all-conference consideration prior to the start of the season, and Crowder, who was an honorable mention in the preseason. Crowder was the only unanimous selection for the first team, teaming up with Marquette guard Darius Johnson-Odom, who was also named to the first team, to form the highest-scoring pair in the conference. In conference games, Crowder finished fourth with 18.0 points per game and tied for first with 2.9 steals per contest. Selected as an honorable mention was Pittsburgh guard Ashton Gibbs, who was selected to the preseason first-team and was named the Preseason Player of the Year. Meanwhile, St. John's placed two players on the All-Rookie Team, guard D'Angelo Harrison and forward Moe Harkless, who were the top two freshman scorers in the conference.

National awards and teams

Players 

West Virginia forward Kevin Jones was recognized as a consensus Second Team All-American after being named to the second team All-American lists by the Associated Press, the USBWA, and the NABC, while the Sporting News named him to their third team. In addition, Marquette forward Jae Crowder was selected as a Second Team All-American by the Associated Press and the Sporting News, as well as to the third team by the NABC. The NABC also named Syracuse forward Kris Joseph to their second team.

Award finalists 
On March 6, the Wooden Award final ballot was released, and included three Big East players. The list was composed of 15 players, reduced from the midseason list of 25. Marquette forward Jae Crowder was the newcomer to the list, while two Big East players who were on the midseason list did not appear on the final ballot: Darius Johnson-Odom and Jeremy Lamb. No Big East players were among the four finalists for the Naismith Award, announced on March 19.

Kentucky forward Anthony Davis was chosen as both the 2012 Wooden Award and 2012 Naismith Award recipient.

Coaches 
Notre Dame head coach Mike Brey was selected for the Jim Phelan Award for the nation's top head coach.

See also 

 2011–12 NCAA Division I men's basketball season
 2011–12 Cincinnati Bearcats men's basketball team
 2011–12 Connecticut Huskies men's basketball team
 2011–12 Georgetown Hoyas men's basketball team
 2011–12 Louisville Cardinals men's basketball team
 2011–12 Marquette Golden Eagles men's basketball team
 2011–12 Notre Dame Fighting Irish men's basketball team
 2011–12 Pittsburgh Panthers men's basketball team
 2011–12 Providence Friars men's basketball team
 2011–12 Seton Hall Pirates men's basketball team
 2011–12 St. John's Red Storm men's basketball team
 2011–12 South Florida Bulls men's basketball team
 2011–12 Syracuse Orange men's basketball team
 2011–12 Villanova Wildcats men's basketball team
 2011–12 West Virginia Mountaineers men's basketball team

Notes and references